The Rural Municipality of Mariposa No. 350 is a rural municipality (RM) in the Canadian province of Saskatchewan within Census Division No. 13 and  Division No. 6.

History 
The RM of Mariposa No. 350 incorporated as a rural municipality on December 12, 1910.

Geography

Communities and localities 
The following urban municipalities are surrounded by the RM.

Villages
 Tramping Lake

The following unincorporated communities are within the RM.

Localities
 Broadacres

Demographics 

Government 
The RM of Mariposa No. 350 is governed by an elected municipal council and an appointed administrator that meets on the second Wednesday of every month. The reeve of the RM is Dale MacArthur while its administrator is Kathy Wurz. The RM's office is located in Kerrobert.

See also 
 List of rural municipalities in Saskatchewan
 List of communities in Saskatchewan

References 

M

Division No. 13, Saskatchewan